House of Baasa is the debut studio album by American duo Zambri. It was released in April 2012 under Kanine Records.

Track listing

References

2012 albums
Kanine Records albums